Moses Masamba Nthuka is an Anglican bishop in Kenya: he has been the Bishop of Mbeere since 12th Oct 2008.

Nthuka was educated at St. Paul's University, Limuru and Anglia Ruskin University Cambridge UK. He was ordained to Priesthood in March 1994 and has served in Kenya and England (Anglican Diocese of Hereford). He has also written a book entitled 'Africa's Faith Based Organizations in Transformational Development'.

References

21st-century Anglican bishops of the Anglican Church of Kenya
Anglican bishops of Mbeere
St. Paul's University, Limuru alumni
Alumni of Anglia Ruskin University
Year of birth missing (living people)
Living people